The Abismo Guy Collet (SP-090) is the deepest cave in South America, and the deepest in the world that is formed in quartzite.

References
A Ong Akakor Geographical Exploring Descobre a Caverna Mais Profunda do Mundo em Quartzito . Ayub, Soraya; 29th Brazilian Speleological Congress, June 2007

Caves of Amazonas
Wild caves
Landforms of Amazonas (Brazilian state)